The 2001–02 EHF Challenge Cup season, was the 9th edition of the European Handball Federation's third-tier competition for men's handball clubs, running from 6 October 2001 to 28 April 2002. It was won by Skjern Håndbold from Denmark.

Knockout stage

Round 2

|}

Round 3

|}

Round 4

|}

Quarterfinals

|}

Semifinals

|}

Finals

|}

References 

2001 in handball
2002 in handball
EHF Challenge Cup